Quiles is a surname. Notable people with the surname include:

 Alberto Quiles (born 1995), Spanish footballer 
 Antonio Jiménez Quiles (born 1934), Spanish cyclist
 Diamilette Quiles (born 1985), Puerto Rican baseballer
 Eduardo Quiles (born 1940), Spanish playwright
 German Quiles (born 1939), American politician
 José Rodríguez Quiles, Puerto Rican politician
 Justin Quiles (born 1990), American singer
 Paul Quilès (born 1942), French politician
 Ricky Quiles (born 1970), American boxer
 Waldemar Quiles (born 1940), Puerto Rican politician

See also
 Copo Quile, village and rural municipality in Argentina

Spanish-language surnames